In classical music a bravura is a style of both music and its performance intended to show off the skill of a performer. Commonly, it is a virtuosic passage performed as a solo, and often in a cadenza.

The term implies "effect for effect's sake", therefore, while many pieces of Beethoven do require a high skill, they are not described as "bravura". Fuller-Maitland suggests the following arias as examples of bravura: "Let the bright Seraphim" from Samson, "Der Hölle Rache kocht in meinem Herzen" (Act II of The Magic Flute) and "Non più mesta" from La Cenerentola.

Musical terms "allegro di bravura" and "con bravura" indicate boldness, fire and brilliance.

The term "bravura" also refers to daring performance in ballet, e.g., in reference of the pas de deux from Le Corsaire. Lynn Garafola describes the Russian ballet school of Marius Petipa as "marrying the new Italian bravura technique to its more lyrical French counterpart".

References 

Music performance
Italian words and phrases